Transverse axis refers to an axis that is transverse (side to side, relative to some defined "forward" direction). In particular:

 Transverse axis (aircraft)
 Transverse axis of a hyperbola, coincides with the semi-major axis